Oost Gelre is a municipality in the Achterhoek, in the eastern Netherlands. On 1 January 2005, the municipalities Groenlo and Lichtenvoorde merged and formed the new municipality Oost Gelre, which was called Groenlo until 19 May 2006.

Population centres

Topography 

Dutch Topographic map of the municipality of Oost Gelre, June 2015

Notable people

Arts

 Marco Blaauw (born 1965 in Lichtenvoorde), trumpeter
 Tom Holkenborg (born 1967 in Lichtenvoorde) aka Junkie XL, composer, multi-instrumentalist, DJ, producer and engineer 
 Peter Beets (grew up in Groenlo), jazz pianist
 Esther Rots (born 1972 in Groenlo), film director
 Menno Veldhuis (born 1974 in Groenlo), artist
 Thomas Puskailer (born 1981 in Lichtenvoorde), Dutch-born Slovak singer and songwriter
 Suzan Stortelder (born 1992 in Ziewent), singer and one half of Suzan & Freek
 Freek Rikkerink (born 1993 in Harreveld), singer and one half of Suzan & Freek

Politics
 Willem Maurits Bruyninck (1689 in Lichtenvoorde - ??), the 25th Governor of Ceylon
 Tjitske Siderius (born 1981 in Groenlo), Dutch politician

Sport 
 Hans Smees (born 1970 in Harreveld), retired motorcycle racer
 Sander Boschker (born 1970 in Lichtenvoorde), retired goalkeeper with 555 club caps
 Tristan Hoffman (born 1970 in Groenlo), retired road racing cyclist
 Dave Bus (born 1978 in Lichtenvoorde), football defender
 Joost Wichman (born 1978 in Lichtenvoorde), mountainbiker and former world champion
 Loes Gunnewijk (born 1980 in Groenlo), former professional Dutch racing cyclist, competed at the 2012 Summer Olympics
 Anneke Beerten (born 1982 in Mariënvelde), mountain cyclist
 Hidde Jurjus (born 1994 in Lichtenvoorde), footballer

Theology
 Herman Herbers (born 1540 or 1544 in Groenlo), theologian and pastor

Gallery

References

External links

Official website

 
Achterhoek
Municipalities of Gelderland
Municipalities of the Netherlands established in 2006